Christian Connection is an online dating service aimed at single Christians in the United Kingdom and Ireland, Australia, New Zealand, United States, Canada, Singapore and Hong Kong. Christian Connection is owned and operated by Widernet Communications Ltd based in London, UK.

History

Christian Connection was founded by Jackie Elton and the UK site was launched at the Greenbelt Festival in August 2000. It opened for registrations shortly after in September of the same year. The site received some media attention in early 2001, featuring on the front page of the Daily Telegraph on 17 April 2001.

In 2004, Christian Connection launched a separate site in Australia under the same name, with a specific focus on single Christians in Australia.

In February 2012, Christian Connection launched in the United States offering a free 6 month membership to all new members. In October 2013 Christian Connection launched sites in Hong Kong and Singapore.

Media coverage

On 18 February 2001 Christian Connection was first featured in the Sunday Telegraph with the headline "Christian dating agency goes online to find perfect partners". The following day it appeared in The Guardian newspaper, as part of a special report on religion in the UK, commenting that there was "an estimated 300,000 single Christians in Britain".

Christian Connection appeared in The Daily Telegraph on the front page on 17 April 2001 with the headline "Seek and ye shall find a wife on the internet". The article claimed that "More than 100 priests and priests-in-training, some of them women, have joined Christian Connection". Since then it has featured frequently in the national media.
Christian Connection has also featured widely in the Christian and church media, including Church Times
 and Ship of Fools.

Christian Connection was named "Best Niche Dating Site" in the 2013 iDate awards  and was included in the Daily Telegraph's "20 most useful dating websites". On 13 November 2014, Christian Connection was awarded Religious Dating Site of the Year at the inaugural UK Dating Awards.

In February 2015, BBC Songs of Praise featured a Christian Speed Dating event, which was run by Christian Connection; plus an interview with the founder Jackie Elton, and a couple who met through the website, as part of a Valentine's Day special.

In November 2015, Christian Connection was awarded Daters' Favourite Site and Best Niche Dating Site at the UK Dating Awards.

Trade association memberships and campaigns

Christian Connection launched a campaign to raise awareness of standards within the online dating industry. Founder, Jackie Elton appeared on the Radio 4 programme 'You and Yours' calling for better regulation within the online dating industry.

Christian Connection was reported by Marketing Week in January 2013 as being one of several dating websites involved in preliminary discussions about establishing a code of conduct for online dating agencies. In August 2013 Jackie Elton was appointed as a Director and Deputy Chairman of the Online Dating Association (ODA) and Christian Connection was accepted as a member.

References

External links
 Official Christian Connection Website
 Christian Connection Events site

Christian websites
Online dating services of the United Kingdom
Internet properties established in 2000